"What Would You Do" is the debut single from Death Row Records duo Tha Dogg Pound, released in 1994 as a double A-side, paired with Nate Dogg's "One More Day". The single was released from the soundtrack Murder Was the Case alongside songs by Snoop Doggy Dogg, DJ Quik, Dr. Dre, Ice Cube, Sam Sneed and other Death Row-affiliated artists. The song also appears on the Natural Born Killers soundtrack and the soundtrack for Entourage (where it is listed as "What Would U Do?"), and is the only song from that soundtrack which does not appear in the movie Natural Born Killers. It also appears in Grand Theft Auto V in the radio station West Coast Classics.

While the notes originally credited solely Daz as producer, Snoop Dogg later revealed that—among other Daz Dillinger tracks—the song was co-produced by Dre.

It is considered to be a diss song towards B.G. Knocc Out, Dresta, Eazy-E and Cold 187um. Eazy-E responded with the tracks "Ole School Shit" and his own version of "What Would You Do" called "Wut Would You Do". B.G. Knocc Out and Dresta responded with "D.P.G./K". Kurupt and Daz's version was performed live at the 1995 Source Awards, and was nominated for Grammy Award for Best Rap Performance by a Duo or Group at the 1996 Grammy Awards.

References

External links
"What Would You Do" lyrics

Music Video Database
[ Billboard]

1994 debut singles
Snoop Dogg songs
Tha Dogg Pound songs
Songs written by Snoop Dogg
Songs written by Daz Dillinger
Songs written by Jewell (singer)
Songs written by Kurupt
Gangsta rap songs
G-funk songs
Song recordings produced by Dr. Dre
1994 songs
Death Row Records singles